Ipatiev may refer to:

 Ipatiev House, a house in Yekaterinburg, Russia where Nicholas II and his family were killed
 Ipatiev Monastery, a monastery in Kostroma, Russia
 Hypatian Codex (also known Ipatiev Chronicle)
 Vladimir Ipatieff (also spelled Ipatiev), a Russian and American chemist